Riccardo Adami (born 27 November 1973) is an Italian engineer working for Scuderia Ferrari, where he is the race engineer of Carlos Sainz Jr. He is the former race engineer of four-time world champion Sebastian Vettel.

Career
Adami obtained a diploma in chassis area at the University of Brescia in 2001 and worked for Minardi since 2002. He worked in several positions throughout the years before ultimately being promoted as the race engineer in 2005.

Adami remained with the team after the team was acquired by the Austrian energy drink maker Red Bull and renamed as Scuderia Toro Rosso at the end of 2005. During his years working in the Italian team, he race-engineered to several drivers, including Vitantonio Liuzzi, Sebastian Vettel, Sébastien Buemi and Daniel Ricciardo.

In 2015, Adami left Toro Rosso and moved to Scuderia Ferrari, working as Vettel's race engineer once again. Adami has been the race engineer for Carlos Sainz Jr. since 2021.

References

1973 births
Living people
Ferrari people
Formula One engineers
Italian automotive engineers
Italian motorsport people
Engineers from Brescia
University of Brescia alumni